Warren Fuavailili is a boxer from Samoa.

He competed at the 2006 Commonwealth Games, where he won a bronze medal for boxing in the Men's Middleweight (75 kg) class.  In 2008 Fuavailili started training the University of Toledo Boxing team, after helping Jonathan Stubenhuis, also from Samoa become the MAC champion, Fuavailili left to continue training for the upcoming Olympics.

References

Living people
Middleweight boxers
Boxers at the 2006 Commonwealth Games
Commonwealth Games bronze medallists for Samoa
Samoan male boxers
Commonwealth Games medallists in boxing
Year of birth missing (living people)
Medallists at the 2006 Commonwealth Games